The 1975–76 Essex Senior Football League season was the fifth in the history of Essex Senior Football League, a football competition in England.

League table

The league featured 13 clubs which competed in the league last season, along with two new clubs, joined from the Metropolitan–London League:
Canvey Island
Eton Manor

League table

References

Essex Senior Football League seasons
1975–76 in English football leagues